The Green Man is a 1956 black and white British black comedy film based on the play Meet a Body by Frank Launder and Sidney Gilliat, who produced and adapted the big-screen version. Gilliat said the film was "okay".

Plot
Harry Hawkins is a freelance assassin who is contracted to blow up Sir Gregory Upshott, a prominent and pompous London businessman. By courting Upshott's spinster secretary, Marigold, he learns that his target will be taking one of the firm's typists for a weekend at a seaside hotel called "The Green Man". Hawkins hides a bomb in a radio, which he plans to leave in the hotel lounge. Finding out his treachery, the secretary comes to his house to confront him but is attacked and left for dead by Hawkins' assistant McKechnie who, as nobody is next door, hides the body there (in a grand piano).

The body is found by a young vacuum cleaner salesman called William Blake who calls there, and he first goes next door and accidentally alerts Hawkins, who has his assistant move the body. He then alerts the house owner Reginald's pretty fiancée, Ann. The two are terrified, and when Reginald returns home he finds them lying on the floor next to the bed, with his fiancée on top of the stranger. Reginald's second furious exit creates doubt over the future relationship. William and Ann then face another moment of horror as the "corpse" staggers into the house through the French doors and, before collapsing again, tells them that Upshott will be blown up that night in the Green Man by a bomb at precisely 22:28.

Meanwhile a new group of figures assemble at The Green Man: Upshott arrives with his shy young secretary Joan, but wants a drink before he registers. The waiter tells them they must order food before 10pm because of the Catering Act. Hawkins arrives and sits in the lounge pretending to enjoy a violin concerto played by three mature ladies. The bomb is in a radio in his suitcase. Hawkins takes the three ladies for a drink in the bar just as Upshott and his secretary rise to take their meal.

Not knowing what Upshott looks like or what name he will register under, Ann and William rush there and decide he will be alone and under a false name. They wrongly assume that the name "Boughtflower" is false and track him down. But the time reaches 22:28 and they dive for cover. The trio starts playing in the lounge again. Hawkins encourages them to play faster and join him again in the bar.

Meanwhile Ann and William cannot get the landlord to believe their story, try to evacuate the place and locate the bomb. Hawkins has put the radio on in the lounge. It announces the time as 22:24. William realises the time on the hall clock was wrong. He starts to evacuate the hotel. Meanwhile Upshott sits closer to the radio to hear an article about himself. William has the brainwave that it will be on a timer in the radio, which he therefore throws towards the sea seconds before it explodes. Hawkins is stopped by the police as he tries to drive off.

Driving back to London, Ann and William hear her fiancé Reginald speaking on the radio: he is reading a poem, but breaks off in the middle to deliver into the microphone a vicious and impassioned diatribe about Ann. They stop driving and share their first kiss.

Cast
Alastair Sim as Harry Hawkins
George Cole as William Blake
Terry-Thomas as Charles Boughtflower, a guest at the Green Man
Jill Adams as Ann Vincent
Raymond Huntley as Sir Gregory Upshott 
Colin Gordon as Reginald Willoughby-Cruft 
Avril Angers as Marigold  
Dora Bryan as Lily, the receptionist and barmaid at the Green Man
John Chandos as McKechnie 
Cyril Chamberlain as Police Sergeant Bassett
Eileen Moore  as Sir Gregory's weekend companion, Joan Wood
Richard Wattis as the doctor called by Blake
Vivien Wood as Leader of the Hotel string trio
Marie Burke as Felicity, member of Hotel string trio
Lucy Griffiths as Annabel, member of Hotel string trio
Arthur Brough as Landlord
Arthur Lowe as Radio salesman
Alexander Gauge as Chairman
Peter Bull as General Niva
Willoughby Goddard as Statesman
Michael Ripper as Waiter at the Green Man
Terence Alexander as Radio Announcer

Production
Cole's then-wife, Eileen Moore, appeared in the film as the typist with whom Upshott has a liaison.

The film, rated U, has been re-released on Region 2 DVD with School for Scoundrels.

Critical reception
The New York Times TV section noted "Weekend at a horrible little country hotel, same name, and one of the funniest British films ever" the Radio Times wrote "If you ever doubted that Alastair Sim was the finest British screen comedian of the sound era, then here's the proof of his immense talent. As the assassin with the mournful smile, he gives a performance of rare genius that more than makes amends for the longueurs in Frank Launder and Sidney Gilliat's script" Allmovie opined "If The Green Man finally falls a little short of being classic, it's only because the mechanics of the plot get a bit wearying at times; otherwise, it's a charmingly subversive little treat" while  Time Out called it "A splendid black comedy."

See also
Green Man

References

External links
 

1956 films
1950s black comedy films
British black-and-white films
British black comedy films
Films directed by Basil Dearden
Films directed by Robert Day
Films set in England
Films set in London
British films based on plays
Films about contract killing in the United Kingdom
Films about assassinations
1956 comedy films
1956 drama films
1950s English-language films
1950s British films